Margëlliç Castle is a castle in the village of Margëlliç near Patos, western Albania. It is a castle that dates from the 7th century AD and is found on top of a hill. The castle was part of the defence system of the ancient city of Byllis. The castle has also been the scene of a World War II battle between the Wehrmacht and Albanian Partisans.

Castles in Albania
Buildings and structures in Patos (municipality)
Tourist attractions in Fier County
Illyrian Albania